Aut Even Hospital is a private hospital in Kilkenny, Ireland. The name is a transcription of the Irish áit aoibhinn meaning beautiful place.

History
Founded by Lady Desart in 1915, the hospital was taken over by the Brothers Hospitallers of Saint John of God in 1933. It was next acquired by Harlequin Healthcare, a company controlled by Gerry Conlan who also owned St. Joseph's Hospital, Sligo, in March 2005. After Conlan acquired Mount Carmel Hospital in Dublin in 2006, his business evolved to become Mount Carmel Medical Group. In 2008, the hospital received Joint Commission accreditation. After Conlan's business got into financial difficulties, a receiver was appointed to dispose of the shareholding in Aut Even Hospital in 2014.

Services
The hospital has 102 in-patient beds, with a catchment area of over 450,000.  It has a twin theatre 18-bed day surgery and endoscopy suite, and 4 main operating theatres. Specialities provided include general medicine, general surgery, ophthalmology, audiology, neurology, cardiology, rheumatology, gynaecology, otolaryngology (ENT), orthopaedics, dermatology, vascular surgery, respiratory medicine, gastroenterology, orthopaedics, urology, MRI and diagnostic imaging, and oral surgery.

References

Hospital buildings completed in 1915
1915 establishments in Ireland
Hospitals established in 1915
Private hospitals in the Republic of Ireland
Hospitals in County Kilkenny